Project Four Racing was a British Formula Two and Formula Three team. The team was founded in 1976 by former Brabham mechanic Ron Dennis. At the end of 1980, the team merged with the McLaren Formula One team.

The road car McLaren MP4-12C also carried the prefix until it was dropped for the 2012 model year. From  onward, after the departure of Dennis from McLaren, the team began to designate their cars with the name "MCL".

Racing history

Formula Two
The team competed in the European Formula Two Championship. Cheever then went on to win Round 8 at the Rouen-Les-Essarts circuit. He finished the season in second place, 12 points behind René Arnoux.

Over the next three seasons, Project Four would win just four more races before the team moved into Formula One with its last win coming thanks to Andrea de Cesaris who won Round 8 of the 1980 season at Misano in Italy driving a March 802-BMW.

Formula Three
Project Four also raced in the British Formula 3 Championship. Its first win came thanks to Chico Serra who won the opening round of the 1979 championship on Silverstone's Club Circuit driving a Toyota powered March 793. Serra won five of the seasons twenty races to win the championship from Andrea de Cesaris who drove a March 793-Toyota for Tiga.

BMW M1 Procar Championship 
For the BMW M1 Procar Championship, all cars were built to identical standards, although their origins varied. BS Fabrications constructed five cars for the BMW factory team, while cars for other competitors were constructed by Project Four Racing or the Italian constructor Osella. The racing cars, designed to meet Group 4 technical regulations, shared only some basics from the M1 road cars.

In 1979, Procar constructor Project Four entered a car for Niki Lauda when he was not in the factory entries. Lauda won 3 races for P4, and the series, before retiring from F1 racing in late September. In 1980, Hans-Joachim Stuck won two events for P4, finishing 3rd overall.

Complete European Formula Two results
(key) (Results in bold indicate pole position; results in italics indicate fastest lap.)

References

External links

Formula Two entrants
British auto racing teams
British Formula Three teams
Auto racing teams established in 1976